Peter Morrison (born 29 June 1980) is an English former professional footballer who played as a midfielder.

Morrison came through the youth academy at Bolton Wanderers and signed a professional contract in 1997. He joined Scunthorpe United in 2000 having failed to make a first team appearance for Bolton. His career was cut short as the result of an injury sustained in a reserve game v Grimsby Town in 2001, after which he became a football agent. He would only make 18 appearances during his professional football career.

Morrison was jailed in 2018 for seven years for causing death by dangerous driving, this was later extended to nine years upon appeal.

Football career

As a player
Manchester-born Morrison joined the youth academy at Bolton Wanderers at the start of the 1996–97 season, straight from school. He turned professional at the age of 17, and was an unused substitute for the first team throughout the 1998–99 season. He remained at the Reebok Stadium until May 2000, when with a year still left on his Bolton contract, he joined Scunthorpe United, hoping for regular first-team football. 

Morrison made his English Football League debut for Scunthorpe in a 1-0 win against Mansfield Town in August 2000. Under manager Brian Laws, Morrison featured in 24 first-team games in all competitions with the club, but on 14 February 2001, he suffered a horror tackle from Grimsby Town defender Ben Chapman in a reserve game which resulted in a double compound fracture to his left leg. The game was abandoned. The injury caused Morrison to retire from the game after 18 months of injury and seven operations. He was eventually awarded more than £450,000 compensation.

As an agent
Upon his premature retirement, Morrison embarked upon a career as a licensed football agent working for YMU Group in Manchester.  His clients include Vincent Kompany, Nedum Onuoha and Ali Al-Habsi. In 2021, a year before his release from prison, Morrison began working at YMU Group again while on day release.

Personal life
Morrison is married to his wife, Siobhan. The couple have one son and reside in Worsley, Manchester.

Death by dangerous driving charge
On 7 November 2017, Morrison was convicted at Carlisle Crown Court of causing death by dangerous driving, following an incident on the M6 motorway in Cumbria on 21 February 2016 when Adam Gibb, a Highways England Traffic Officer was killed and his Traffic Officer colleague Paul Holroyd was left paralysed from the chest down after being struck by a Mercedes 4x4 driven by Morrison. The court was told Morrison had been driving at average speeds of 81mph and had exchanged 25 texts during his journey as well as texting 96 seconds before the fatal crash. Morrison pleaded guilty to causing death by careless driving, but denied the death by dangerous driving charge. Morrison described himself as "remorseful" and wrote a letter to the court stating: "I will punish myself, mentally, for this until the day I die."

On 19 January 2018, Morrison was found guilty of causing death by dangerous driving and was sentenced to seven years' imprisonment. He also received an eight-year driving ban. It was revealed in court that Morrison already had a previous conviction for using mobile phone whilst driving.

In April 2018, Morrison’s sentence was increased to nine years by the Court of Appeal after referral by the Solicitor General who deemed the original sentence to be too short.

References

External links

1980 births
Living people
Footballers from Manchester
English footballers
Association football midfielders
Bolton Wanderers F.C. players
Scunthorpe United F.C. players
English Football League players
British sports agents
Prisoners and detainees of England and Wales
Sportspeople convicted of crimes